Statistics of the Primera Fuerza for the 1914–15 season.

Overview
It was contested by 6 teams, and Club España won the championship.

League standings

Top goalscorers
Players sorted first by goals scored, then by last name.

References
Mexico - List of final tables (RSSSF)

1914-15
Mex
1914–15 in Mexican football